Alain Patrice Nganang (born 1970) is an American writer, poet and teacher of Cameroonian origin, a member of the Bamileke people.

He was born in Yaoundé, Cameroon, and was educated in Cameroon and Germany. He was awarded a Ph.D. in comparative literature at Johann Wolfgang Goethe University. During 2006–2007, he was the Randolph Distinguished Visiting Associate Professor of German Studies at Vassar College. He was an instructor at the Shippensburg University until 2007, and is now a Professor of Comparative Literature at Stony Brook University. His 1999 novel Temps de chien was awarded the Prix Littéraire Marguerite Yourcenar in 2001 and the Grand prix littéraire d'Afrique noire in 2002.

Disappearance and arrest 
On December 7, 2017, Nganang was reported missing at the Douala airport where he was to catch a flight on Kenya Airways to Harare, Zimbabwe, the day after publishing an article on the site Jeune Afrique, criticising Paul Biya's government for its handling of protests by English-speaking Cameroonians. Nganang was detained for three weeks as he was about to fly out of his country of birth

Release and deportation
On December 27, 2017, a judge in Cameroon ordered his release. Nganang was deported back to the US, where he also holds dual citizenship.

Bibliography
 La Promesse des fleurs, 1997
 Temps de chien, 1999; trans. in English, Dog Days, 2006
 La Joie de vivre, 2003
 Dernières nouvelles du colonialisme, 2006
 L’Invention du beau regard, 2005
 Mont Plaisant, 2011; trans. in English, Mount Pleasant, 2016
 La Saison des prunes, 2013; trans. in English, When the Plums Are Ripe, 2019
  Empreintes de Crabe, 2018; trans. in English, A Trail of Crab Tracks, 2022 (ISBN 9780374602987)
 Mboudjak: Les Aventures du Chien-Philosophe, JC Lattès, (2021)

Essays
 Le principe dissident, 2005
 Manifeste d'une nouvelle littérature africaine, 2007
 L'Afrique répond à Sarkozy - Contre le discours de Dakar, ouvrage collectif, 2008

References

External links

1970 births
20th-century essayists
20th-century male writers
20th-century novelists
20th-century poets
21st-century essayists
21st-century male writers
21st-century novelists
21st-century poets
Cameroonian essayists
Cameroonian male writers
Cameroonian novelists
Cameroonian poets
Goethe University Frankfurt alumni
Living people
Male novelists
Male poets
People from Yaoundé
Shippensburg University of Pennsylvania faculty
Stony Brook University faculty
Vassar College faculty